Soricidex is a genus of tiny mites that live on the head and body of its host species, the common shrew (Sorex araneus).

Only one species has been formally described, Soricidex dimorphus, but V. Bukva mentions two more undescribed species from his collection.

References

Acari genera
Parasitic acari
Parasitic arthropods of mammals
Trombidiformes